MK6-83 is a chemical compound which acts as a channel opener for the TRPML family of calcium channels, with moderate selectivity for TRPML1 over the related TRPML2 and TRPML3 subtypes.

See also 
 ML-SI3
 ML2-SA1
 SN-2

References 

1-Piperidinyl compounds
Sulfonamides
Thiophenes
Anilines